Zale perculta, the Okefenokee zale moth, is a species of moth in the family Erebidae. It is found in North America.

The MONA or Hodges number for Zale perculta is 8718.

References

Further reading

 
 
 

Omopterini
Articles created by Qbugbot
Moths described in 1964